An election to Ceredigion District Council was held in May 1991.  It was preceded by the 1987 election and followed, after local government reorganization, by the first election to Ceredigion County Council in 1995. On the same day there were elections to the other local authorities and community councils in Wales.

Overview
The Independents remained the largest group with a number of councillors elected unopposed. The uncontested wards were mainly in rural areas. However, some wards were keenly contested, including Cardigan.

Results

Aberaeron (one seat)

Aberporth (one seat)

Aberystwyth East (two seats)

Aberystwyth North (two seats)

Aberystwyth South (two seats)
Both successful candidates had previously served as SDP councillors but did not join the Liberal Democrats.

Aberystwyth West (two seats)

Beulah (one seat)

Borth (one seat)

Capel Dewi (one seat)

Cardigan (three seats)

Ceulanamaesmawr (one seat)

Ciliau Aeron (one seat)
Stanley Meredith Thomas had been elected at a by-election following the death of the previous member.

Faenor (one seat)

Lampeter (two seats)

Llanarth (one seat)
Thomas had stood as an Alliance candidate in 1987

Llanbadarn Fawr (two seats)

Llandyfriog (one seat)

Llandysiliogogo (one seat)

Llandysul Town (one seat)

Llanfarian (one seat)

Llanfihangel Ystrad (one seat)
Jones stood as a Liberal in 1987

Llangeitho (one seat)

Llangybi (one seat)

Llanrhystud (one seat)

Llansantffraed (one seat)

Llanwenog (one seat)

Lledrod (one seat)

Melindwr (one seat)

New Quay (one seat)

Penbryn (one seat)

Penparc (one seat)

Tirymynach (one seat)
The sitting Plaid Cymru councilor failed to submit a valid nomination.

Trefeurig (one seat)

Tregaron (one seat)

Troedyraur (one seat)

Ystwyth one seat)

References

1991 Welsh local elections
1991
20th century in Ceredigion